Sandrini is an Italian surname. Notable people with the surname include:

 Domenico Sandrini (1883–1973), Italian cross-country skier, Nordic combined skier, and ski jumper
 Luis Sandrini (1905–1980), prolific Argentine comic film actor and film producer
 Mattia Sandrini
 Peter Sandrini

Italian-language surnames
Patronymic surnames
Surnames from given names